Eenhana is an electoral constituency in the Ohangwena Region of Namibia, on the border to Angola. It had 24,193 inhabitants in 2004 and 15,912 registered voters . The district centre is the town of Eenhana.

Politics
As is common in all constituencies of former Owamboland, Namibia's ruling SWAPO Party has dominated elections since independence. In the 2015 regional election SWAPO won by a landslide. Its candidate Nehemiah Haufiku gathered 6,113 votes, while the only opposition candidate, Dawid Johannes of the Rally for Democracy and Progress (RDP), received 188 votes. The 2020 regional election was also won by the SWAPO candidate. Olivia Tuyenikelao Hanghuwo received 6,021 votes, far ahead of Abed-Nego Hishoono of the Independent Patriots for Change (IPC), an opposition party formed in August 2020, who obtained 926 votes.

References 

Constituencies of Ohangwena Region
States and territories established in 1992
1992 establishments in Namibia